Hamza Dahmane (born September 22, 1990) is an Algerian football player who plays as a goalkeeper for French club US Gieres.

He been capped for Algeria at the under-23 level.

Club career
On March 29, 2010, Dahmane made his senior debut for CR Belouizdad as a starter in a league match against ES Sétif.

In August 2017, Dahmane joined FC Échirolles. Two years later, he joined US Gieres.

International career
In May 2010, after making his senior debut for CR Belouizdad, Dahmane was called up by Algeria's Under-23 coach, Abdelhak Benchikha, for a 10-day training camp in Italy's Coverciano training complex. On November 16, 2011, he was selected as part of Algeria's squad for the 2011 CAF U-23 Championship in Morocco.

References

External links
 DZFoot Profile
 

1990 births
Algeria under-23 international footballers
Algerian footballers
Algerian Ligue Professionnelle 1 players
Algerian Ligue 2 players
CR Belouizdad players
MC Oran players
CS Constantine players
ASM Oran players
FC Échirolles players
Living people
2011 CAF U-23 Championship players
Footballers from Algiers
Association football goalkeepers
21st-century Algerian people
20th-century Algerian people